Felix Owolabi  (born 24 November 1954) is a retired Nigerian footballer who played for the  Nigerian national team. Playing much of his career as a left winger, he played for Nigeria at the 1978 African Cup of Nations and at the 1980 Summer Olympics. He played with the Nigerian teams that came third at the 1978 African Cup of Nations and won the African Cup of Nations in 1980.

Holder of a doctorate degree in Physical education, Owo-blow as he is fondly called, also played for Kaduna Rocks (of Kaduna), Raccah Rovers of Kano, and the  IICC Shooting Stars (of Ibadan). He was with the latter club for 15 years, during which, in 1992, he helped the club win the CAF Cup (now known as the CAF Confederation Cup).

References

External links
 
 

1956 births
Living people
Association football midfielders
Nigerian footballers
Nigeria international footballers
Africa Cup of Nations-winning players
1978 African Cup of Nations players
1980 African Cup of Nations players
Footballers at the 1980 Summer Olympics
Olympic footballers of Nigeria
Yoruba sportspeople
Racca Rovers F.C. players
African Games silver medalists for Nigeria
African Games medalists in football
Competitors at the 1978 All-Africa Games